Ngile, also known as Daloka, Taloka, Darra, Masakin, Mesakin [a dialect], is a Niger–Congo unwritten language in the Talodi family spoken in the southern Nuba Mountains in the south of Sudan. It is 80% lexically similar with Dengebu, which is also spoken by the Mesakin people.

Dialects
Dialects are (Ethnologue, 22nd edition):
Masakin Tuwal dialect (spoken in Masakin and Togosilu villages)
Daloka dialect (spoken in Daloka and El Aheimar villages)

References

Severely endangered languages
Talodi languages